Achaea is a constituency of the Hellenic Parliament. It corresponds to Achaea Prefecture and elects eight members of parliament. The members of the prominent Papandreou politician family (Georgios Papandreou, Andreas Papandreou, George Papandreou) come from this constituency.

Election results

Legislative election

Members of Parliament

Current members
Sia Anagnostopoulou (SYRIZA)
Andreas Rizoulis (SYRIZA)
Kostas Spartinos (SYRIZA)
Andreas Katsaniotis (New Democracy)
Fotini Gennimata (PASOK)
Nikos Nikolopoulos (Independent Greeks)
Nikolaos Karathanasopoulos (Communist Party of Greece)
Iason Fotilas (The River)

Older members (January 2015 – September 2015)
Sia Anagnostopoulou (SYRIZA)
Vasileios Chatzilamprou (SYRIZA)
Maria Kanellopoulou (SYRIZA)
Andreas Katsaniotis (New Democracy)
Nikos Nikolopoulos (Independent Greeks)
Nikolaos Karathanasopoulos (Communist Party of Greece)
Iason Fotilas (The River)
Michail Arvanitis-Avramis (Golden Dawn)

Notes and references

Parliamentary constituencies of Greece
Achaea